The SATM mine is a Chinese copy of the AT2 scatterable anti-tank mine. It is scattered either from a mine scattering vehicle or by 122 mm Type 84 rockets which hold eight mines each. The mine functions in the same way as the AT-2 with a seismic sensor that activates the mine and a magnetic influence sensor combined with a "scraping wire" sensor to ensure optimum detonation.

Specifications
 Weight: 2.2 kg
 Diameter: 114 mm
 Height (excluding scraping wire fuze): 125 mm

References
 Janes Mines and Mine Clearance 2005-2006

Weapons of the People's Republic of China
Anti-tank mines
Submunitions